The 1992–93 Kent Football League season was the 27th in the history of the Kent Football League, a football competition in England.

The league was won by Tonbridge who was promoted back to the Southern Football League after four seasons in the Kent League.

League table

The league featured 20 clubs which competed in the previous season, along with one new club:
Folkestone Invicta, joined from Division Two

League table

References

External links

1992-93
1992–93 in English football leagues